Roberto Müller (born 6 October 1902, date of death unknown) was a Chilean sports shooter. He competed at the 1936 Summer Olympics and 1948 Summer Olympics.

References

1902 births
Year of death missing
Chilean male sport shooters
Olympic shooters of Chile
Shooters at the 1936 Summer Olympics
Shooters at the 1948 Summer Olympics
Place of birth missing
20th-century Chilean people